Bussy-le-Grand is a commune in the Côte-d'Or department in eastern France.

Population

Personalities
Jean-Andoche Junot, a general under Napoleon was born in the village. The Château de Bussy-Rabutin, home of the 17th-century courtier and writer Roger de Rabutin, Comte de Bussy, is located within the commune.

The American painter Douglas Gorsline (1913-1985) lived in the village for twenty years.

See also
Communes of the Côte-d'Or department

References

Communes of Côte-d'Or
Côte-d'Or communes articles needing translation from French Wikipedia